Cladidium is a genus of two species of lichen in the  family Lecanoraceae. Cladidium was circumscribed by Josef Hafellner in 1984 with C. thamnitis assigned as the type species. C. bolanderi was added to the genus in 1989.

References

Lecanoraceae
Lecanorales genera
Lichen genera
Taxa named by Josef Hafellner
Taxa described in 1984